List of works by or about Jane Mayer, American journalist.

Books

Essays and reporting

Notes

Bibliographies by writer
Bibliographies of American writers